San Pedro Mixtepec may refer to
San Pedro Mixtepec, Juquila, a municipality in Juquila District of Oaxaca
San Pedro Mixtepec, Miahuatlán, a municipality in the Miahuatlán District of Oaxaca